Yadira is a given name. Notable people with the given name include:

Yadira Bendaña (born 1968), Honduran journalist and politician
Yadira Caraveo (born 1980), American politician
Yadira Geara (born 1986), Dominican beauty queen and former tennis player
Yadira Guamán (born 1986), Ecuadoran race walker
Yadira Guevara-Prip, American television actor
Yadira Henríquez (born 1958), Dominican attorney and politician
Yadira Lira (born 1973), Mexican athlete and coach
Yadira Narváez (born 1985), Colombian serial killer
Yadira Pascault Orozco, French-Mexican actress and producer
Yadira Serrano Crespo (born 1976), Mexican politician
Yadira Silva (born 1985), Cuban-born Mexican table tennis player